Font Bureau Agency is a geometric sans-serif typeface family intended for titles and headings, released between 1990 and 1995. It was designed by David Berlow of Font Bureau.

It is an expansion of a capitals-only titling face created in the 1930s by Morris Fuller Benton, adding lower-case characters and a wider range of widths and weights. The expanded design somewhat resembles his classic Bank Gothic.

Usage
Agency is the main font in the 2011 first-person shooter videogame Crysis 2 and the 2012 first-person shooter videogame Call of Duty: Black Ops 2 and used in the logo for the in-development science fiction first-person shooter videogame trilogy Interstellar Marines. The Vancouver Canucks NHL club now uses the font, in modified form, with the introduction of Reebok's Edge uniform style in 2007. Nike has since adopted the typeface for use in their ice hockey uniforms for several countries, beginning in the 2010 Winter Olympics. The font was also widely used in the 2003 space flight simulator game Freelancer. It was also used in 2009 film 2012. The mobile version of PlayerUnknown's Battlegrounds also utilizes the font in its UI. The Road & Track magazine also used Agency FB in 2011-12.

Two styles are supplied with Microsoft Office

Russian public sports channel, Match TV uses a typeface that resembles Agency FB, but with some modifications. The online technology magazine How-To Geek uses the font for its logo.

Agency FB fonts
Agency FB Thin
Agency FB Light
Agency FB Regular
Agency FB Bold
Agency FB Black
Agency FB Compressed Thin
Agency FB Compressed Light
Agency FB Compressed Really 
Agency FB Compressed Bold
Agency FB Compressed Black
Agency FB Condensed Thin
Agency FB Condensed Light
Agency FB Condensed Regular
Agency FB Condensed Bold
Agency FB Condensed Black
Agency FB Wide Thin
Agency FB Wide Light
Agency FB Wide Regular
Agency FB Wide Bold
Agency FB Wide Black
Agency FB Extended Thin
Agency FB Extended Light
Agency FB Extended Regular
Agency FB Extended Bold
Agency FB Extended Black

References

External links
 http://store.typenetwork.com/foundry/fontbureau/fonts/agency-fb

Font Bureau typefaces
Geometric sans-serif typefaces
Typefaces designed by Morris Fuller Benton
Typefaces designed by David Berlow